Electric Raceabout (ERA) is an all-electric sports car developed by the Helsinki Metropolia University of Applied Sciences. It contains lithium-titanate batteries, four direct drive electric motors, and a carbon fiber monocoque chassis with steel sub-frames.

ERA has an operational range of 200 km. Its total weight is 1,700 kg with a 550 kg battery pack. The power output of its engines is 200 kW with a peak output of 300 kW / 10 seconds. The engines' nominal torque is 1000 Nm with a peak torque of 3200 Nm. ERA has a top speed of 200 km/h with 0–100 km acceleration in 6.0 seconds.

ERA was introduced in the summer of 2009 with a target to reach low volume production.

ERA took part in the Automotive X Prize competition and came in second in its class. ERA made a new road-legal electric vehicle lap record in Nürburgring Nordschleife in September 2011.

In the winter of 2011–2012, ERA had its inverters, aerodynamics and power steering upgraded – after improvements ERA's total motor power of 282 kW was measured on the dynamometer. In March 2012, ERA topped a speed of 260 km/h while driving on the ice at Lake Ukonjärvi, Inari. With an average speed of 252 km/h, ERA is the fastest EV on ice. ERA was parked outside in freezing temperatures before the event, proving that an EV can operate in freezing temperatures.

Chinese car manufacturer AET is planning to produce electric cars based on ERA technology.

References

External links

Electric sports cars
Science and technology in Finland